Sai Yok is a district (amphoe) in Kanchanaburi province in western Thailand.

Geography 

The district is in the valley of the Khwae Noi River in the Tenasserim Hills area. It borders Myanmar to the south. Along the river the Death Railway runs to Nam Tok Sai Yok Noi.

Sai Yok National Park was created on 27 October 1980 and covers an area of about 500 km2. The most famous sight in the park is the Sai Yok waterfall.

Neighboring districts are (from north clockwise) Thong Pha Phum, Si Sawat, Mueang Kanchanaburi of Kanchanaburi Province and Tanintharyi Division of Myanmar.

Sights 
Apart from the nature of the Kwae Noi River valley, the other main attraction is Mueang Sing Historical Park, which shows the westernmost Khmer-style temple complex. Also popular for tourists is the Tiger Temple.

Administration

Central administration 
Sai Yok is divided into seven sub-districts (tambons), which are further subdivided into 57 administrative villages (mubans).

Local administration 
There are three sub-district municipalities (thesaban tambons) in the district:
 Nam Tok Sai Yok Noi consisting of parts of sub-district Tha Sao.
 Wang Pho consisting of parts of sub-district Lum Sum.
 Sai Yok consisting of sub-district Sai Yok.

There are six sub-district administrative organizations (SAO) in the district:
 Lum Sum consisting of parts of sub-district Lum Sum.
 Tha Sao consisting of parts of sub-district Tha Sao.
 Sing consisting of sub-district Sing.
 Wang Krachae consisting of sub-district Wang Krachae.
 Si Mongkhon consisting of sub-district Si Mongkhon.
 Bongti consisting of sub-district Bongti.

Popular culture
 Sai Yok was the location of shooting the Vietnam scenes of the 1978 film The Deer Hunter.
 Sai Yok was mentioned in the song "Mon Sai Yok" (มนต์ไทรโยค - "Magic Of Sai Yok") by the Thai pop rock band The Innocent from an album Yu Hor (อยู่หอ - Stay Dorm) in 1982.  The song is about a delightful time in Sai Yok.

References

External links

amphoe.com

Sai Yok